Ludmila Müllerová (born 27 September 1954) is a Czech politician, who served as the Minister of Labour and Social Affairs from November 2012 to July 2013. She was named Minister of Labour and Social Affairs by President Václav Klaus in November 2012.

References

External links
  Official website

1954 births
Living people
People from Lanškroun
Members of the Chamber of Deputies of the Czech Republic (1998–2002)
Labour and Social Affairs ministers of the Czech Republic
TOP 09 politicians
KDU-ČSL MPs
KDU-ČSL Senators
Mendel University Brno alumni